Chekak (also known as Chegak and Jakak) is a village in Kuhmareh Rural District, Kuhmareh District, Kuhchenar County, Fars Province, Iran. At the 2006 census, its population was 1,224, in 285 families.

References 

Populated places in Chenar Shahijan County